Nossa Senhora do Pranto is a civil parish in the municipality of Ferreira do Zêzere, Portugal. It was formed in 2013 by the merger of the former parishes Paio Mendes and Dornes. The population in 2011 was 1,089, in an area of 30.48 km².

References

Freguesias of Ferreira do Zêzere